Aïn Fares may refer to:

Aïn Fares, M'Sila, Algeria
Aïn Fares, Mascara, Algeria